Uno's Garden is a picture book written and illustrated by Australian children's author Graeme Base. The story features themes of environmental degradation, conservation of nature and habitat, and extinction.  It also features arithmetic, and at the back of the book there are instructions for several number games relating to the book. It also contains a game in the book where you have to find an amount of plants, animals, buildings and sometimes one snortelpig.  All of the animals and plants featured in the book were invented by the author.  Some of the animals included are the snortlepig, moopaloop, lumpybum, and frinklepod.

The human voice of the story is that of the aptly named Uno, the first human to move into the forest.  The story continues as other people follow Uno in moving into the forest and, as the number of people and buildings increases, the number of plants and animals decreases until there are none left, which leads to future generations rebuilding the city with more environmental consciousness. The book has been chosen as the theme of the 2007 Myer Christmas Windows in Melbourne and Brisbane, Australia.

Awards
 2008 COOL Awards - Picture Book Category - Shortlisted
 2008 KROC Awards - Picture Book Category - Shortlisted
 2008 Kids Own Australian Literature Award (KOALA) - Picture Book Category - Shortlisted
 2008 Young Australian Best Book Award (YABBA) - Picture Book Category - Winner
 2007 Green Earth Book Award - Winner
 2007 Book of the Year Awards - Lower Primary Category - Winner
 2007 Wilderness Society Environment Award - Picture Book Category - Winner
 2007 Australian Book Industry Awards - Young Children - Shortlisted
 2007 Kids Own Australian Literature Award (KOALA) - Picture Book Category - Shortlisted

References

External links

 Uno's Garden at Penguin Books

2006 children's books
Picture books by Graeme Base
Australian children's books